John Westin (born 19 May 1992) is a Swedish former professional ice hockey forward who last played for Timrå IK in the HockeyAllsvenskan (Allsv). He was drafted in the seventh round, 207th overall, in the 2010 NHL Entry Draft by the Montreal Canadiens.

After suffering a broken arm during the 2010 pre-season, Westin made his Elitserien debut for Modo Hockey on 19 February 2011 against Djurgården. His older brother Jens also plays professionally and was formerly a teammate at Modo and Timrå IK.

References

External links

1992 births
Living people
Asplöven HC players
Modo Hockey players
Montreal Canadiens draft picks
IF Sundsvall Hockey players
Swedish ice hockey left wingers
Timrå IK players